Vivien Silfany-Tony (born 22 August 1989) is an Indonesian former professional tennis player.

She made her debut as a professional in December 2004, aged 15, at an ITF tournament in Jakarta. She won two ITF doubles titles in 2007.

Silfany-Tony was part of the Indonesia Fed Cup team in 2008. Playing for Indonesia in Fed Cup, she has a win–loss record of 0–3.

Career statistics

ITF finals

Doubles (2–4)

External links
 
 
 

Indonesian female tennis players
1989 births
Living people
People from Palembang
21st-century Indonesian women